"There's a sucker born every minute" is a phrase closely associated with P. T. Barnum, an American showman of the mid-19th century, although there is no evidence that he actually said it. Early examples of its use are found among gamblers and confidence tricksters.

Attribution to Barnum
Barnum's biographer Arthur H. Saxon tried to track down when Barnum had uttered this phrase but was unable to verify it. According to Saxon, "There's no contemporary account of it, or even any suggestion that the word 'sucker' was used in the derogatory sense in his day. Barnum was just not the type to disparage his patrons."

Some sources claim that it is most likely from famous con-man Joseph ("Paper Collar Joe") Bessimer, and other sources say that it was actually uttered by David Hannum in reference to Barnum's part in the Cardiff Giant hoax. Hannum was exhibiting the "original" giant and had unsuccessfully sued Barnum for exhibiting a copy and claiming that it was the original. Crowds continued to pay to see Barnum's exhibit, even after both it and the original had been proven to be fakes. A circus competitor to Barnum, Adam Forepaugh, attributed the quote to Barnum in a newspaper interview in an attempt to discredit him.

Another source credits late 1860s Chicago saloon owner Michael Cassius McDonald as the originator of the aphorism. According to the book Gem of the Prairie: Chicago Underworld (1940) by Herbert Asbury, McDonald was equipping his gambling house known as The Store when his partner expressed concern over the large number of roulette wheels and faro tables being installed and their ability to get enough players. McDonald then allegedly said, "Don't worry about that, there's a sucker born every minute."

History
Early uses of the phrase refer to it as a catch-phrase among gamblers. In an 1879 discussion of gambling in Chicago, an "old-timer" is quoted as saying, "[G]oodness knows how they live, it’s mighty hard times with the most of them; in the season they make a bit on base ball, or on the races, and then, you know, 'there’s a sucker born every minute', and rigid city legislation drives the hard-up gambler, who would be a decent one of the kind, to turn skin-dealer and sure-thing player." The use of quotation marks indicates that it must already have been an established catch-phrase.

The phrase appears in print in the 1885 biography of confidence man Hungry Joe, The Life of Hungry Joe, King of the Bunco Men. 

In a slightly different form, the phrase shows up in the January 1806 European Magazine:  "That there vash von fool born every minute.'"
According to David W. Maurer, writing in The Big Con (1940), there was a similar saying amongst con men: "There's a mark born every minute, and one to trim 'em and one to knock 'em."  Here "trim" means to steal from, and "knock" means to persuade away from a scam.  The meaning is that there is no shortage of new victims, nor of con men, nor of honest men.

In the 1930 John Dos Passos novel The 42nd Parallel, the quotation is attributed to Mark Twain.

See also
Barnum effect

References

External links

English phrases
Quotations
1870s neologisms
P. T. Barnum